Line 13 is a north-west to south-east line of the Shanghai Metro network. It was once used as a dedicated line (Expo line) for the World Expo to serve the 2010 Shanghai World Expo. The line is colored pink on system maps.

History

Special Phase
Following the end of the Expo, this phase was closed. This part of the line reopened on December 19, 2015, along with the full opening of the line.

1st Phase
The section opened on December 2012.

2nd Phase and 3rd Phase
The rest of the line was opened on December 19, 2015.

Stations

Service routes

Important Stations

  - located under the busy Nanjing Road. Interchange with lines 2 and 12.
  - located near East China Normal University and Global Harbor. Interchange with lines 3 and 4.
  - located by Xintiandi Style Mall and the renovated Xintiandi Shikumen neighborhood. Interchange with line 10.

Future Expansion

The stations are: Jizhai Road station; Fangle Road station; Jile Road station; Yunle Road station; and Zhuguang Road station. Construction started on June 28, 2021.

Both are underground lines with 2 stations.

Station name change

Headways 
<onlyinclude>
<onlyinclude>
<onlyinclude>

Technology

Rolling Stock
Trains have a capacity of about 1,860 people.

Former Rolling Stock

Cars 09A02 (numbers 942-945, 948) were used in the past, only used during the 2010 Shanghai World Expo, which were reassigned from line 9 to line 13, all of which have now been transferred back to line 9.

References

External links

Shanghai Metro lines
 
Railway lines opened in 2010
2010 establishments in China
1500 V DC railway electrification